Liangzhu or Liang Zhu may refer to:

Written as 良渚
 Liangzhu culture, Neolithic culture in the Yangtze River Delta of China

Written as 梁祝
 Butterfly Lovers or Liangzhu, a Chinese legend of a tragic love story of a pair of lovers
 The Lovers (1994 film) or Liángzhù, a Hong Kong film by Tsui Hark
 Butterfly Lovers (album), a 2005 album by Denise Ho
 Liangzhu, Henan, town in Runan County, Henan, China

See also
 Butterfly Lovers (disambiguation)
 Liangzhu Culture Museum